Harold Earnshaw, Harry "Shake" Earnshaw, (24 September 1915 – 16 May 1985) was an English racing cyclist from Yorkshire. In 1938 he was acclaimed as the British Best All-Rounder when his three best event performances were aggregated into 399 miles at 22.627 mph.

His achievements were celebrated in 1939 when Cycling Weekly awarded him his own page in the Golden Book of Cycling, which is now held in 'The Pedal Club' archive.

Personal life
Harry Earnshaw lived in Royston, South Yorkshire and was a natural athlete and cyclist. He worked as a coal-miner from school-leaving age (c. 1930) until 1938.

Harry was given the nickname "Shake" by a visiting uncle. Who after reading a popular magazine called "Fragments", within its pages were a series of cartoons featuring a sergeant-major glaring at a new recruit shouting "Before you come on parade tomorrow, Shakespeare get your hair cut."

Turning to the young Harry, who had a good thick crop of dark hair, he said "Shakespeare, get your hair cut". This was adopted as his nickname and over the years, Shakespeare was shortened to "Shake" a name that stayed with him all his life.

Career
Earnshaw started road racing in 1935 when he was 18 years old, winning his first event, 25-miles in 1 hour 18 minutes despite several delays, a fall and mechanical damage. He was renowned as a tough, resilient, uncomplaining rider, coping with mechanical and physical set-backs.

In 1936 the 'Monckton Cycling Club', sponsored by Carlton Cycles* of Worksop, won the team section of the British Best All-Rounder and Earnshaw was fifth in the individual listing. 
 Although Carlton Cycles may have supplied machines on favourable terms to certain riders in the club, the rules governing amateur status were so strict that it was even forbidden to allow the makers name to be shown in any photographs of the rider. There was certainly no such thing as a sponsored club in those days. In 1938, the R.T.T.C. (Road Time Trials Council), the governing body of this branch of the sport, issued an edict prohibiting amateur racing cyclists who were staff employees of cycle manufacturers from appearing on their trade stands at the National Cycle Show. It is alleged that the ban on names being shown led to the development of certain unique frame designs (Bates, Hetchins, Baines etc.) to circumvent this.
 
In the 1937 British Best All-Rounder, Earnshaw improved to third overall whilst Monckton C.C. again won the team prize. He also won the 'Sheffield Phoenix 25 mile Time Trial in 1 hour, 1 minute 46 seconds.

In 1938  Earnshaw won the British Best All-Rounder with the record average speed of 22.627 mph. This was reward for his victory in the Westerley 100-mile competition in a record time of 4 hours 20 minutes 48 seconds, plus two seasons best performances of 50-miles in 2 hours 4 minutes 21 seconds and 249 miles in 12 hours.

The Golden Book
Harry Earnshaw's achievements were celebrated in 1938 when Cycling Weekly awarded him his own page in the Golden Book of Cycling.

Later years
In his senior years he became an accomplished after dinner speaker, but later came the sad news of his multiple amputations, a decision which was made due to the clotting of the arteries in his legs, the result of which confined him to a wheelchair.

Harry died on Thursday, 16 May 1985 aged 69.

References

1915 births
1985 deaths
Cyclists from Yorkshire
Sportspeople from Wakefield